Kimsa Ukru Punta (Quechua kimsa three, ukru hole, pit, hollow, punta peak; ridge, "three hollows peak", also spelled Quinsaucro Punta) is a  mountain in the Andes of Peru which reaches a height of approximately . It is located in the Huánuco Region, Yarowilca Province, Aparicio Pomares District.

References

Mountains of Peru
Mountains of Huánuco Region